Takeover is an upcoming American action thriller directed by Greg Jonkajtys and starring Quavo and Billy Zane.

Cast
Quavo as Guy Miller
Billy Zane as Gamal Akopyan
Serayah as Lt. Keisha Jenner
LaMonica Garrett as Sheriff ‘Herc’ Hitchens
Martin Sensmeier as Hilario

Production
In August 2022, it was announced that Quavo and Zane were cast in the film.  In September 2022, it was announced that Serayah joined the cast of the film.  Later that same month, it was announced that Garrett and Sensmeier were added to the cast.

Filming began in September 2022 and occurred in Atlanta.

References

External links
 

Upcoming films
Films shot in Atlanta
Films with screenplays by Jeb Stuart